Maria-sama ga Miteru is a light novel series written by Oyuki Konno and illustrated by Reine Hibiki. Shueisha published 37 light novel volumes from April 1998 to April 2012 under their Cobalt imprint. There were also two additional volumes published, the first containing an overview of the series and interviews, and the second featuring an illustration collection. Also listed are short stories published in Shueisha's Cobalt magazine, which were included in later volumes of the novels. Konno also wrote the spin-off light novel series Oshaka-sama mo Miteru, which is also illustrated by Hibiki. Shueisha published 10 volumes of the spin-off from August 2008 to November 2013.


Maria-sama ga Miteru

Light novels

Additional volumes

Short stories
These short stories by Oyuki Konno are published in the bimonthly edition of Cobalt, published by Shueisha.

, February 1997, pp. 303–330
, February 2003, pp. 185–199
Published in volume 16 of the novels, Variety Gifts.
, April 2003, pp43–58
Published in volume 16 of the novels, Variety Gifts.
, December 2003, pp25–41
Published in volume 16 of the novels, Variety Gifts.
, February 2004, pp20–34
Published in volume 19 of the novels, In Library.
, April 2004, pp17–29
Published in volume 19 of the novels, In Library.
, August 2004, pp21–29
Published in volume 19 of the novels, In Library.
, December 2004, pp. 17–25
Published in volume 19 of the novels, In Library.
, April 2005, pp. 45–53
Published in volume 30 of the novels, Frame of Mind.
, August 2005, pp. 46–54
Published in volume 30 of the novels, Frame of Mind.
, February 2006, pp. 17–25
Published in volume 30 of the novels, Frame of Mind.
, April 2006, pp. 44–52
Published in volume 30 of the novels, Frame of Mind.
, August 2006, pp. 19–27
Published in volume 30 of the novels, Frame of Mind.
, December 2006, pp. 17–25
Published in volume 30 of the novels, Frame of Mind.
, April 2007, pp. 17–25
Published in volume 30 of the novels, Frame of Mind.
, August 2007, pp. 17–25
Published in volume 37 of the novels, My Nest.
, February 2008, pp. 185–193
, April 2008, pp. 17–25
Parts I and II published as a single story in volume 36 of the novels, Little Horrors.
, September 2008, pp. 19–30
Published in volume 36 of the novels, Little Horrors.
, January 2009, pp. 30–42
Published in volume 36 of the novels, Little Horrors.
, May 2009, pp. 17–28
Published in volume 36 of the novels, Little Horrors.
, September 2009, pp. 153–165
Published in volume 39 of the novels, Farewell Bouquet.
, July 2010, pp. 17–29
Published in volume 38 of the novels, Step.
, November 2010, pp. 17–30
Published in volume 39 of the novels, Farewell Bouquet.
, May 2011, pp. 17–28
Published in volume 39 of the novels, Farewell Bouquet.
, November 2011, pp. 9–21
Published in volume 39 of the novels, Farewell Bouquet.
, March 2012, pp. 9–21
Published in volume 39 of the novels, Farewell Bouquet.

Oshaka-sama mo Miteru
Konno and Hibiki have also collaborated on the  series of light novels. These books feature the same characters but focus on Yumi's younger brother Yūki and his schoolmates at Hanadera.

Light novels

Short stories
, Bessatsu Cobalt special issue June 2008, pp. 19–70
Published in volume 1 of the novels, Crimson or White.
, January 2010, pp. 17–31
Published in volume 6 of the novels, S-kinship.

References

Maria-sama ga Miteru
Maria-sama ga Miteru
Maria-sama ga Miteru